Evangelion refers to the gospel in Christianity, translated from the Greek word  meaning "Good News". 

Evangelion may also refer to:

 Gospel account
 Gospel Book
 In Manichaeism, a major text known as the Evangelion, also known as the Gospel of Mani

Arts and entertainment

 Neon Genesis Evangelion (franchise), a media franchise
 Neon Genesis Evangelion, an anime television series
 Neon Genesis Evangelion (manga), a manga based partially on the anime
 Neon Genesis Evangelion (video game), a video game based on the anime and the film The End of Evangelion
 Neon Genesis Evangelion: ANIMA, a series of light novels set on an alternate timeline, three years after the events of the original series
 Rebuild of Evangelion, a series of animated films that retell the events of the anime in a new way and provides a different conclusion to the events of the series
 Evangelion (mecha), cyborgs that appear in the anime
 Evangelion (album), a 2009 studio album by Polish blackened death metal band Behemoth

See also
 Evangelical (disambiguation)
 Good news (disambiguation)
 Gospel (disambiguation)